Blush is a 2019 American comedy-drama film directed by Debra Eisenstadt and starring Wendi McLendon-Covey. It premiered in the U.S. Dramatic Competition section at the 2019 Sundance Film Festival under the title Imaginary Order. The film was released on April 10, 2020 by Gravitas Ventures.

Plot
McLendon-Covey plays a obsessive-compulsive, middle-aged woman who finds that her husband is having an affair, and her thirteen-year-old daughter is becoming estranged.

Cast
 Wendi McLendon-Covey as Cathy
 Christine Woods as Gemma Jean
 Max Burkholder as Xander
 Kate Alberts as Tara
 Steve Little as Matthew
 Catherine Curtin as Gail

Reception
The film received mixed to positive reviews from critics.

References

External links
 

2019 films
2019 drama films
American drama films
2010s English-language films
2010s American films